Uudo Sepp (born 28 March 1997) is an Estonian singer.

He was born in Kuressaare.

In 2018, he won first place in the television program Eesti otsib superstaari. In 2020, he competed in Eesti Laul, the annual music competition organised by Estonian public broadcaster Eesti Rahvusringhääling (ERR) to determines the country's representative for the Eurovision Song Contest. He achieved 10th place.

Discography

 single "Tahan elada" (2018)
 album "Sinule" (2018)

References

1997 births
Living people
21st-century Estonian male singers
Estonian pop singers
People from Kuressaare